Aurel Voss (7 December 1845 – 19 April 1931) was a German mathematician, best known today for his contributions to geometry and mechanics. He served as president of the German Mathematical Society for the 1898 term.
He was a professor at the University of Munich during 1902–1923. He became Emeritus in 1923.

In 1880, Voss published a version of the contracted Bianchi identities.

Publications

Notes

External links
 

1845 births
1931 deaths
19th-century German mathematicians
20th-century German mathematicians
People from Altona, Hamburg
Academic staff of the Ludwig Maximilian University of Munich